Nag Vidarbha Andolan Samiti also known as NVAS is a political outfit fighting for separate statehood for Vidarbha region in Maharashtra, India.

References

Vidarbha
Political parties in Maharashtra
Regionalist parties in India
Political parties with year of establishment missing